The women's 100 metres hurdles event at the 1989 Summer Universiade was held at the Wedaustadion in Duisburg on 27 and 28 August 1989.

Medalists

Results

Heats
Wind:Heat 1: +1.4 m/s, Heat 2: +1.1 m/s, Heat 3: +1.9 m/s

Final

Wind: +1.5 m/s

References

Athletics at the 1989 Summer Universiade
1989